Pentecostalism is the fastest-growing Christian denomination in Brazil. Pentecostalism has surged since the 1990s while the largest denomination, Roman Catholicism, has undergone in a decline. At some points, churches were appearing as rapidly as one church per day. Pentecostalism in Brazil traces its roots to the Azusa Street Revival in 1906 in Los Angeles and, like Pentecostal movements in other countries, emphasizes a second act of grace following conversion that results in gifts of the Spirit such as glossolalia and healing.

History 
Scholars organize the Pentecostal movement in Brazil into three types, or "waves", organized by both time periods and doctrinal shifts.

The First Wave: the Assemblies of God, 1910-1950's 
Europeans who converted to Pentecostalism in the United States were the first missionaries to bring the new movement to Brazil. These first Pentecostal churches emphasized gifts of the spirit such as speaking in tongues, casting out demons, and prophesying.

In 1911, two Swedish missionaries, Gunnar Vingren and Daniel Berg, founded future Assemblies of God churches in northern Brazil. Vingren and Berg avoided emphasizing social mobility or formal education because of their experiences of cultural marginalization in Sweden, which led to the development of national leadership within the Assemblies of God. By 1930, the Brazilian Assemblies of God were autonomous from that of Sweden's and had churches in nearly every state in Brazil. Post-1934 American missionaries began to arrive, but were generally not well-accepted in the existing national network of churches and missionaries virtually ceased post-1950's.

In 1910, an Italian man named Luigi Francescon founded a church in Sao Paulo which became the Christian Congregation. This remains the largest Pentecostal church in the state of Sao Paulo, partially because it spread rapidly among the Italian population and was then assimilated into the larger culture. It has between one and two million members. Growth has slowed since the 1940s, in part because it is primarily a rural and small-town church.

The Second Wave: the Foursquare gospel, 1954-1980's 
The epicenter of the second wave of Brazilian Pentecostalism was Sao Paulo, beginning in the 1950s. It differed from the first wave in its emphasis on healing as a gift of the Holy Spirit and its use of mass media to reach even greater parts of the Brazilian populace.

A former actor named Harold Williams helped start a Brazilian extension of Aimee Semple McPherson's L.A.-based Foursquare Gospel church in 1954. It would eventually be called the IEQ, after several restructures from the "National Evangelization Crusade" to the "Crusade Church" to IEQ. Perhaps because of its association with the Foursquare church, 35% of the IEQ's pastors are women, making it unique among the historical Brazilian churches. By 1988, the church would become totally separate from the Los Angeles church. It also began experiencing significant growth in the 1980s, becoming one of the fastest-growing churches in Brazil.

Brazil for Christ (BPC) was founded in 1955 and was the first major Pentecostal church to be founded by a Brazilian. Manoel de Mello began as a preacher in the National Evangelization Crusade, but quickly left it to form his own church after accusations of charlatanism. The BPC quickly became a staple in Sao Paulo religious life, even getting involved in politics (which most Pentecostal churches at that time left alone). By the 1980s, however, the church's influence had diminished greatly.

The God Is Love church (IPDA) belongs to the second wave, with its founding in 1962 and use of the radio to reach large numbers of (mostly poor) Brazilians, but it precedes the Universal Church of the Kingdom of God in its reclamation of Catholic rituals and its attacks on religious beliefs based in Afro-Brazilian traditions like candomblé and umbanda. It also has a rigid doctrine, which makes it criticized by other churches, and even considered by some as a destructive cult.

The Third Wave: The Universal Church of the Kingdom of God,  
The third wave of Pentecostalism is sometimes referred to as neo-Pentecostalism or post-Pentecostalism, and is generally associated with the Universal Church of the Kingdom of God (IURD). For this and several other churches like the International Grace of God Church, Rebirth in Christ, and Evangelical Community Heal Our Earth, the focus moved to curing, prosperity, and spiritual warfare against the evil spirits which are believed to populate the world.

The IURD was founded in Rio de Janeiro in 1977 by Edir Macedo.  In 1989, Macedo and the IURD purchased TV Record, at the time the Brazil's fifth-largest TV network, aiding in its evangelism. It has about one and a half million members, mainly located in Rio, Sao Paulo, and Bahia. For many reasons, the church has faced heavy public criticism, but one incident involved a bishop kicking the likeness of a popular saint. IURD does not view the Catholic church favorably, but it does not see it as the real enemy. It emphasizes spiritual warfare, in direct opposition to popular folk religions in Brazil like umbanda and candomble, which have their roots in Afro-Brazilian traditions and involve communing with spirits. The IURD also emphasizes Prosperity theology, which has helped the church's popularity among poorer citizens of Brazil.

Theology and Politics

Theology 
The church and the world are, if not completely opposing, two very distinct things to Pentecostals, who tend to be concerned with individual salvation and sanctification and so see the church as a community of faith nurturing that journey. Modern Pentecostal churches in Brazil also emphasize healing and driving out of demons versus the traditional mark of the gifts of the spirit, glossolalia.

In Assemblies of God churches, tithing is an important part of their beliefs. It is seen as an empowering act which contradicts the giver's poverty because they could be spending their money on food or other items but are instead giving it to the poor.

In IURD, prosperity theology is central to their teaching. The church says that rewards for faith should be expected in this life, a teaching which becomes very plausible in the context of the urban poor which comprise much of IURD's membership. And while it separates wealth and salvation, the IURD emphasizes that entrepreneurship and perseverance are important parts of showing faith that God will provide.

Politics 
Pentecostals comprise about 15% of all Brazilian Christians. Since Brazil's transition to a democracy, several Pentecostal churches have become involved in politics. Voting is compulsory in Brazil, but Pentecostal churches traditionally took a hands-off approach to politics, preferring to think of the church as apolitical until organizations like the Assemblies of God and the IURD entered politics and won several seats in the national Congress. 
Pentecostal churches tend to emphasize a citizen's duty rather than their rights, and do not speak very much about citizenship. This is not, however, because they do not care about society, but rather because the churches provide immediate answers to problems found in the everyday lives of poor people, which leads to greater citizenship even if it not explicitly stated. And, while Pentecostals tend to be morally conservative, they are found across the political spectrum and can even lean to the political left on certain issues.

References

Sources 

Protestantism in Brazil